Immatain is a Palestinian village located in the northwestern West Bank, in the Qalqilya Governorate of the State of Palestine, about seventeen kilometers southwest of Nablus. The current mayor of Immatain is Haythem Sawan.

Since 2012, the village of Farratin is included in Immatain.

Location
It is bordered by Tell to the east, Deir Istiya  to the south, Jinsafut, Al Funduq and Hajja  to the west, and Kafr Qaddum and Jit to the north.

History

Immatain has been identified with the Israelite village of Elmatan, which was mentioned in one of the Samaria Ostraca.

Ceramics dating from the Byzantine period have been found in the village.

According to a tradition recalled by a Samaritan High Priest in the 20th century, two hundred Samaritans in Immatain were reportedly forced to convert to Islam by Saladin; however, written sources make no further reference to this event.

Ottoman era
Immatain was incorporated into the Ottoman Empire in 1517 with all of Palestine, and in 1596 Immatain  appeared in the tax registers as Matin, being in the Nahiya of Jabal Qubal of the Liwa of Nablus. It had a population of 20 households and 1 bachelor, all Muslim. The villagers paid a fixed tax rate of 33.3% on a number of crops,  including wheat, barley, summer crops, olives, goats and beehives; a total of 3,000 akçe.

In 1838, Amatin was noted as located in Jurat Amra, south of Nablus.

In 1882, the PEF's Survey of Western Palestine Immatain was described as "a village of moderates size on the slope of the hill, with a few olives."

British Mandate era
In the 1922 census of Palestine conducted by the British Mandate authorities, Immatain (called "Ammatain") had a population of 234, all Muslim, increasing in the 1931 census to 334 Muslims in 67  houses.

In the 1945 statistics the population of Immatin was 440, all Muslims, while the total land area was 7,155 dunams, according to an official land and population survey. Of  this, 967 were allocated for plantations and irrigable land, 3,067 for cereals, while 32 dunams were classified as built-up (urban) areas.

Land ownership of Immatain in 1945
The following is a breakdown of land ownership in 1945.

Land usage of Immatain in 1945
The following is a breakdown of the land usage during 1945 in the dunams.

Jordanian era
In the wake of the 1948 Arab–Israeli War, and after the 1949 Armistice Agreements, Immatain came under Jordanian rule. It was annexed by Jordan in 1950.

The Jordanian census of 1961 found 782 inhabitants in Immatin.

Post-1967
Since the Six-Day War in 1967, Immatain has been held under Israeli occupation.

After the 1995 accords, 58.3% of the total village land of Immatain/Fara'ata was classified as Area B, while the remaining 41.7% was classified as Area C. Israel has expropriated 163 dunams of land from Immatain for the construction of the Israeli settlement of ‘Sha’ar Emmanuel’, part of the Immanuel settlement.

In 2013 complaint were made over "training exercises" which the Israeli army held in the village. “The troops spread out through the village for several hours, withdrawing just before midnight." According to the Israeli army,  the exercise was a "navigating run … whose purpose was to acquaint the forces more closely with the relevant sector, as well as demonstrating IDF presence in the area".

Population
According to the Palestinian Central Bureau of Statistics, Immatain had a population of approximately 2,450 inhabitants in mid-year 2006. Almost double the amount live abroad for political and economical reasons. Each year, on average two family units emigrate from Immatain. Immatain has four families. They are Sawan, Ghanim, Albaree, and Matanee.

Population growth (1922 - 2007)

Footnotes

Bibliography

External links
 Welcome To Immatin
Survey of Western Palestine, Map 11:     IAA, Wikimedia commons 
 Immatin Village (including Far’ata Locality) (Fact Sheet),   Applied Research Institute–Jerusalem (ARIJ)
 Immatin Village Profile (including Far’ata Locality),  ARIJ
Immatin, aerial photo, ARIJ
Development Priorities and Needs in Imatin (including Far’ata Locality), ARIJ
 Israeli Hoax of Barriers removal 22, June,2004
 New Palestinian Enclaves created by the Israeli updated wall map around Ariel Settlement Bloc. 14, June, 2006, POICA
Testimony: Settlers attack Palestinian farmers on their land, Jan. '09, B'Tselem
 Gilad Zoher colony: a source of continuous aggression against Palestinian farmers, 20, May, 2009, POICA
Harvest under Fire, This week in Palestine

Qalqilya Governorate
Villages in the West Bank
Municipalities of the State of Palestine
Ancient Samaritan settlements